is a greatest hits album by Chara, featuring her Sony material, which was released on September 5, 2007. It debuted at #14 on the Japanese Oricon album charts, and charted in the top 300 for 12 weeks. It eventually sold 65,328 copies.

The album was released to coincide with the 10 year anniversary of her million selling album, Junior Sweet. It was also released seven months after her comeback album under Universal, Union. Two versions of the album was released: a limited edition 2CD+DVD set, as well as a regular 2-CD set. The DVD featured 18 of Chara's Sony era music videos.

Track listing

Japan Sales Rankings

Various charts

References
 	

Chara (singer) compilation albums
2007 greatest hits albums
2007 video albums